Hans Jakob (16 June 1908 – 24 March 1994) was a German football player. He was born in Munich.

He played over 1000 games as goalkeeper for SSV Jahn Regensburg, and also for FC Bayern Munich from 1942 to 1945. He earned 38 caps for the Germany national football team, and was part of two World Cups teams in 1934 and 1938, but played in only one game, the third-place playoff in 1934. Jakob was a member of the famous "Breslau Elf" that defeated Denmark 8–0 in 1937. In his 38 international games, Jakob kept eleven clean-sheets and while he was in goal, Germany were only defeated eight times. He was also part of Germany's squad at the 1936 Summer Olympics.

'Jakl' Jakob was an all-round athlete who managed considerable results in track-and-field, winning the Bavarian hurdles race championships repeatedly, which led a decathlon promoter to almost persuade him to pursue a decathlon career. Jakob became Germany’s number one goal keeper after the 1934 World Cup, replacing Willibald Kress, who had fallen out of favour with Reich coach Otto Nerz after a momentous blunder by Kress in the semi final had arguably cost Germany a place in the final. He died in Regensburg.

In his 1978 book Fussball, Helmut Schön characterised Jakob as follows:

"Thanks to his size and physical impact he was especially adept in catching high crosses and usually prevailed in turmoils inside the goal mouth."

References

1908 births
1994 deaths
Footballers from Munich
German footballers
Germany international footballers
1934 FIFA World Cup players
1938 FIFA World Cup players
Olympic footballers of Germany
Footballers at the 1936 Summer Olympics
Association football goalkeepers
SSV Jahn Regensburg players
FC Bayern Munich footballers